Novator is a rural locality (a village) and the administrative center of Samotovinskoye Rural Settlement, Velikoustyugsky District, Vologda Oblast, Russia. The population was 2,767 as of 2002. There are 40 streets.

Geography 
Novator is located 7 km southwest of Veliky Ustyug (the district's administrative centre) by road. Valga is the nearest rural locality.

References 

Rural localities in Velikoustyugsky District